91 may refer to:

Years
 91 BC
 AD 91
 1991
 2091
 etc.

Transportation
 List of highways numbered 
 91 Line, a rail line
 Saab 91, an aircraft

Other uses
 91 (number)
 91:an, a Swedish comic
 91, a 2017 album by Jamie Grace
 Ninety One (group), a Kazakh boy group
 Ninety-One (solitaire)
 Ninety One plc, an Anglo-South African asset management business
 Protactinium, atomic number 91

See also